Pagan rock is a genre of rock music created by adherents of neopagan traditions. It emerged as a distinct genre from gothic rock in the 1980s. Bands in this genre will often use pagan and occult imagery and deal with pagan themes. In some cases the definition is stretched to include rock bands embraced by modern Pagans.

History
An early neopagan rock band was The Quest, created by Todd Allen. Pagan rock as a more distinct genre emerged in the United Kingdom in 1980s, in particular from gothic rock and related post-punk genres. Gothic rock had become popular among younger pagans as an alternative to the singer-songwriter style established by pagans from the baby-boom generation, which dominated the neopagan institutions in the 1980s and 1990s. One of the first bands to be labeled as Pagan rock by the press was Inkubus Sukkubus, founded in 1989, who have Wiccan members and whose songs use pagan imagery and pagan themes. After Inkubus Sukkubus had some mainstream success with their debut album in 1993, many gothic rock and darkwave bands emerged with neopagan members and lyrical themes. By the mid-2000s, pagan rock had become fully integrated into the mainstream of neopagan events and institutions.

Characteristics
The term "Pagan rock" differentiates the genre from new-age music, and from the traditional folk music found at many Neopagan events and gatherings. While many bands under this loose category do incorporate rock and roll styles, one can also find bands inspired by gothic rock, medieval music, the darker elements of traditional and folk music, Celtic music, neofolk and neo-classical, darkwave, ethereal, ambient, industrial and experimental music.

In many ways, the label of "Pagan rock" carries with it the same complexities and problems as Christian rock. Like contemporary Christian music, it is more an umbrella term than a cohesive musical genre. The Pagan rock label can include bands like Inkubus Sukkubus and The Moon and the Nightspirit who explicitly state their allegiance to Neopaganism; bands like Abney Park who have Neopagans in the band but do not label themselves as pagan rock, and bands like Unto Ashes who sing songs involving occult and Neopagan themes but avoid publicly labeling their personal belief systems.

See also
Neopagan music
Wave-Gotik-Treffen
Folk rock
Goth subculture
Dark wave
Neofolk
Pagan metal
Viking rock

References

Citations

Sources

External links
 List of Pagan artists on Witchvox
 Pagan rock on the internet

Alternative rock genres
Modern pagan music
1980s in modern paganism